Southern Pacific Railroad (SP) 2579 is a heavy 2-8-0 type steam locomotives built by Baldwin Locomotive Works in 1906, a typical example of over 350 locomotives called "Consolidations".  2579 was retired from service in 1956 and is currently in display in the Veterans Memorial Park in Klamath Falls, Oregon. Last used in revenue service in November 1956, 2579 was donated to the City of Klamath Falls on September 1957.

History 
Locomotive #2579 is a typical example of steam locomotives called "consolidations" that were used by the Southern Pacific Railroad. It worked on many different duties for the Southern Pacific system from the early 20th century well into 1956, even handling passenger trains on rare occasions. At nearly 400,000 pounds and at 71 feet in length, #2579 was utilized for freight on the SP's Portland, Sacramento, Shasta, and Western Divisions.  It was retired from steam freight operations in November 1956 and vacated from the active roster of locomotives in May 1957.

Southern Pacific Locomotive #2579 was donated to the City of Klamath Falls on September 8, 1957.  Since then, SP2579 has been on display in Veterans Memorial Park along the shores of Lake Ewauna, near the junction of Main Street and US97.

References 

2579
Baldwin locomotives
2-8-0 locomotives
Individual locomotives of the United States
Standard gauge locomotives of the United States
Railway locomotives introduced in 1906
Preserved steam locomotives of Oregon